The Rural Municipality of Hart Butte No. 11 is a rural municipality (RM) in the Canadian province of Saskatchewan within Census Division No. 3 and  Division No. 2. Located in the south-central portion of the province, it is adjacent to the United States boundary, neighbouring Daniels County in Montana.

History 
The RM of Hart Butte No. 11 incorporated as a rural municipality on January 1, 1913.

Geography

Communities and localities 
The following urban municipalities are surrounded by the RM.

Towns
 Coronach

The following unincorporated communities are within the RM.

Localities
 Buffalo Gap
 Coronach/Scobey Border Station Airport

Demographics 

Government 
The RM of Hart Butte No. 11 is governed by an elected municipal council and an appointed administrator that meets on the second Thursday of every month. The reeve of the RM is Craig Eger while its administrator is Leanne Totton. The RM's office is located in Coronach.

Transportation 
The RM is a part owner of the Fife Lake Railway.

See also 
List of rural municipalities in Saskatchewan

References 

H

Division No. 3, Saskatchewan